The 2021 FA Community Shield (also known as The FA Community Shield supported by McDonald's for sponsorship reasons) was the 99th FA Community Shield, an annual football match played between the winners of the previous season's Premier League, Manchester City, and the winners of the previous season's FA Cup, Leicester City. This was Manchester City's first FA Community Shield appearance since 2019 when they beat Liverpool 5–4 on penalties after a 1–1 draw, and Leicester's first since losing 2–1 to Manchester United in the 2016 edition. The game was played on 7 August 2021 at Wembley Stadium in Wembley, London, with Leicester beating Manchester City 1–0 with a 89th-minute penalty by Kelechi Iheanacho.

Arsenal were the defending champions as winners of the 2020 FA Community Shield, but did not qualify for this edition, as they failed to win either the Premier League or FA Cup. The match was televised live on ITV. It was the first time the FA Community Shield went free-to-air on television since the 2012 FA Community Shield, which was also shown on ITV.

Background 
 
Leicester City won their first FA Cup title after beating Chelsea 1–0 in the final. They were appearing in their third FA Community Shield match, having won one (1971), and lost one (2016).

Manchester City won their third Premier League title in four years under the management of Pep Guardiola, after derby rivals Manchester United lost 2–1 to Leicester City at Old Trafford on 11 May 2021. They were appearing in their 13th match, having won six (1937, 1968, 1972, 2012, 2018, 2019), and lost six (1934, 1956, 1969, 1973, 2011, 2014).

Match

Summary
In the first half, Steffen managed to save a shot from Vardy with his trailing right foot while diving to the left, with ball coming back off the left post. In the last minute of the match Leicester were awarded a penalty when Aké tripped Kelechi Iheanacho in the penalty area after he had failed to control a pass from Rodri. Iheanacho scored the penalty left-footed to the right of the net to win the game 1–0. This was the first time that a team from outside the so-called Big Six had won the Charity/Community Shield since 1995, when Everton beat Blackburn Rovers.

Details

Post-match
Leicester City boss Brendan Rodgers spoke to BBC Radio Leicester about winning the Community Shield for the first time: "There was a great feeling coming here today. Every Leicester player, fan, staff member coming here, it was a really special feeling. We wanted to take that into the game and keep that feeling going, and thankfully we've done that." Manchester City manager Pep Guardiola congratulated Leicester on their win and said, "I am more than satisfied with how we played. Many things were really good, the young players were excellent. We got minutes for players so in general, many good things." Guardiola gave debuts to academy players Cole Palmer, Samuel Edozie and Ben Knight; Edozie and Palmer started the match and Knight came off the bench to replace Ferran Torres in the 74th minute.

Leicester City started their 2021–22 Premier League campaign with a 1–0 win over Wolverhampton Wanderers at the King Power Stadium, with Jamie Vardy scoring the only goal in the 41st minute, while Manchester City began the defence of their league title at the Tottenham Hotspur Stadium where they faced Tottenham Hotspur; they lost 1–0 to a Son Heung-min goal in the 55th minute, giving new Tottenham Hotspur head coach Nuno Espírito Santo his first win in charge of the club. Manchester City's record signing Jack Grealish made his first start for the club in that match.

References

FA Community Shield
Community Shield
Charity Shield 2021
Charity Shield 2021
Community Shield
Events at Wembley Stadium
FA Community Shield